Nation River may refer to:

 South Nation River in Ontario
 Petite-Nation River in Quebec
 Nation River (British Columbia), a river in the Peace River watershed in British Columbia